Abba bar Dudai was head of the Academy of Pumbedita (at the time within the Abbasid Caliphate) from 772 till about 780 CE. Sherira Gaon adds to Abba's name the words "our grandfather," which, however, are not meant to indicate that Dudai was an immediate ancestor of Sherira. A copyist's attempt to change the rare name "Dudai" into "Judai" adds to the confusion; for Judai Gaon, the actual grandfather of Sherira, lived a full century later than Dudai.

References

8th-century rabbis
Jews from the Abbasid Caliphate
8th-century people from the Abbasid Caliphate